Benso Oil Palm Plantation is a Ghanaian oil palm plantation and company, based at the Adum Banso Estate in the Western Region of Ghana. The company is  listed on the Ghana Stock Exchange,  its symbol is (BOPP). It was founded in 1978  and was listed in the Ghana Stock exchange GSE in 2004  and is involved with the production and processing of crude palm oil CPO for refining and a host of industrial uses.
Benso Oil Palm Plantation Limited is a Ghana-based company engaged in the business of growing oil palm. The Company owns over 5,000 hectares of oil palm plantation in Ghana. The Company is a subsidiary of Wilmar International Limited.

References

External links
Benso Oil Palm Plantation at Africaselect
Benso Oil Palm Plantation at Alacrastore

Oil palm
Ghanaian companies established in 2004
Companies listed on the Ghana Stock Exchange
Forestry in Ghana
Palm oil production in Ghana
Agriculture companies established in 2004